Ásványráró is a village in Győr-Moson-Sopron County, Hungary.

Location 

Ásványráró lies the central part of Szigetköz, next to Danube, between Győr and Mosonmagyaróvár. In 1936, two village (Ásvány and Ráró) was united.

Sightseeing 

 In the end of the village to Dunaszeg, it sees the famous "Kálvária". Count Lázár Apponyi was built in Baroque style in 1738.
 Near the "Kálvária", there stand the monument of the victims of World War II. József Somogyi (famous sculptor) carved out.
 Near to Kálvária stand an old black aspen tree. It is 100 years old. Protected natural values. The diameter is ~550 cm.
 Because the most of the villagers are Roman Catholic (c. 96%), there are two (so-called) búcsú, of the village's churches. In Ásvány there is a church named for St. Andrew. It is 136 m2 from the 14th century. In Ráró there is a church named for St. Roch which is from the 17th century.

External links 
 Street map 
 Official page 

Populated places in Győr-Moson-Sopron County